Irumbai is a village situated next to Auroville in the Indian state of Tamil Nadu, some 10 km from Pondicherry.

Temple

An ancient temple dedicated to Lord Shiva is there hosting Magakaleswarar, Maga Kalanathar and goddesses Mathura Sundara Nayagi and Kuil Mozhiyammai. This temple has ancient records written by Thirugnanasambantha Swamigal.

This Shivasthalam temple is 9 km from Pondicherry on Pondicherry—Tindivanam bus route. Another Paadal Petra Sthalam Tiruarisili is 5 km northwest of this Sthalam.

Villages in Viluppuram district